ONT or Ont may refer to:

Organisations
 Organización Nacional de Transplantes (National Transplant Organization), a Spanish government agency
 Ordo Novi Templi (Order of the New Templars), an occult anti-semitic society founded 1907 by  Lanz von Liebenfels
 Ontario Network Television, a predecessor of the defunct Canadian Baton Broadcast System
 Obshchenatsional'noe Televidenie (All-National Television), a Belarusian national television station
 Oxford Nanopore Technologies, a UK-based nanopore sequencing company

Transportation
 On Ting stop (MTR station code ONT), a Light Rail stop in Hong Kong
 Ontario International Airport (IATA code ONT), a public airport in Ontario, California, US
 Ontario Northland Railway, a Canadian railway operated by the Ontario Northland Transportation Commission

Science and technology
 Optical network terminal, an interface between a company's fiber optic network and premises wiring
 Ortho-nitrotoluene, an organic compound

Other uses
 Ontario (Ont.), a province of Canada